The 2004–05 FC Lorient season was the club's 79th season in existence and the third consecutive season in the second division of French football. In addition to the domestic league, Lorient participated in this season's edition of the Coupe de France and the Coupe de la Ligue. The season covered the period from 1 July 2004 to 30 June 2005.

Players

First-team squad

Transfers

In

Out

Pre-season and friendlies

Competitions

Overview

Ligue 2

League table

Results summary

Results by round

Matches
The league fixtures were announced on 2 July 2004.

Coupe de France

Coupe de la Ligue

Statistics

Goalscorers

References

External links

FC Lorient seasons
Lorient